The Mixed  trap team event at the 2020 Summer Olympics took place on 31 July 2021 at the Asaka Shooting Range.

Records
Prior to this competition, the existing world and Olympic records were as follows.

Schedule
All times are Japan Standard Time (UTC+9)

Results

Qualification

Finals

References

Shooting at the 2020 Summer Olympics
Mixed events at the 2020 Summer Olympics